All asset management companies (AMC) in Singapore are being oversee by Monetary Authority of Singapore (MAS). AMC is generally an asset management / investment management company/firm that invests the pooled funds of investors in securities in line with the stated investment objectives.

Regulated by MAS
To conduct the regulated activity of fund management either as a Licensed FMC, a Registered FMC or a Venture Capital Fund Manager, AMC will need to register with MAS.

Investment fee in Singapore
AMC in Singapore provide their investment services for a fee. They charge commission fees for each transaction you make. That means that when you buy shares, you get charged. When you sell your shares, you also get charged.

For a fee, the company/firm provides more diversification, liquidity, and professional management consulting service than is normally available to individual investors. The diversification of portfolio is done by investing in such securities which are inversely correlated to each other. Money is collected from investors by way of floating various collective investment schemes, e.g. mutual fund schemes. In general, an AMC is a company that is engaged primarily in the business of investing in, and managing, portfolios of securities.

Largest companies
The following is a list of the top 5 AMCs located in Singapore (as of 2017):

Notable AMCs within S.E.A

Asia

 Aberdeen Asset Management
 Affin Hwang Asset Management Berhad
 Asia Frontier Capital Ltd.
 BNY Mellon Investment Management
 Capital Dynamics
 Conning & Company
 Eastspring Investments
 IDFC Project Equity
 Investcorp
 Mirae Asset Group
 Nomura Group
 Standard Life Aberdeen
 SinoPac Financial Holdings
 Value Partners

Australia

 Aberdeen Asset Management
 Standard Life Aberdeen
 AMP Capital
 Macquarie Group

See also
 List of asset management firms
 List of investment banks
 List of private equity firms

References

 How to Setup a Singapore Fund Management Company

External links
 Asset Management Company (AMC) Definition on Investopedia

Finance lists
Asset
Asset management